John Eliot, 1st Earl of St Germans (30 September 1761 – 17 November 1823), known as the Lord Eliot from 1804 to 1815, was a British politician.

Eliot was born at Port Eliot, Cornwall, the third son (second surviving) of Edward Craggs-Eliot, 1st Baron Eliot, and his wife Catherine Elliston. He was educated at Pembroke College, Cambridge, taking an M.A. in 1784. He served from 1780 to 1783 as Member of Parliament for St Germans and from 1784 to 1804 for Liskeard. He also held the position of His Majesty's Remembrancer in the Court of the Exchequer. On 17 February 1804 he succeeded his father as second Baron Eliot. In 1808 he became Colonel of the East Cornwall Militia, and in 1810, Lieutenant-Colonel Commandant.

On 28 November 1815, Eliot was created Earl of Saint Germans, in the County of Cornwall, with a special remainder to his brother William Eliot and his heirs male. In February 1816 he took his seat in the House of Lords.

Family
John married twice but without issue:

 On 9 September 1790 at St James Church, Westminster to Caroline Yorke (29 August 1765 – 26 July 1818). Caroline was a daughter of Charles Yorke, Lord High Chancellor of Great Britain.
 On 19 August 1819 to Harriet Pole-Carew (9 February 1790 – 4 March 1877). She was the daughter of Reginald Pole-Carew.

Lord St Germans died on 17 November 1823 at Port Eliot, and was buried on 27 November at St Germans Church. He was succeeded by his brother William Eliot, 2nd Earl of St Germans.

References

Saint Germans, John Eliot, 1st Earl of
Saint Germans, John Eliot, 1st Earl of
Members of the Parliament of Great Britain for constituencies in Cornwall
British MPs 1784–1790
British MPs 1790–1796
British MPs 1796–1800
Members of the Parliament of the United Kingdom for constituencies in Cornwall
Earls of St Germans
Saint Germans, John Eliot, 1st Earl of
People from St Germans, Cornwall
UK MPs 1801–1802
UK MPs 1802–1806
Saint Germans, E1
UK MPs who were granted peerages
John Eliot